New Kent County is a county in the eastern part the Commonwealth of Virginia. As of the 2020 United States Census, its population was 22,945. Its county seat is New Kent.

New Kent County is included in the Greater Richmond Region.

History

New Kent County was established in 1654, as the Virginia General Assembly with the governor's consent split York County. The county's name originated because several prominent inhabitants, including William Claiborne, recently had been forced from their settlement at Kent Island, Maryland, by Lord Baltimore upon the formation of Maryland. Claiborne had named the island for his birthplace in Kent, England. Chickahominy and Pamunkey Native Americans frequented this area, as well as nearby Charles City County and King William County, and both tribes remain well-established in this area.

The county had two parishes in the colonial era, initially called Blisland (which also included the older James City County as well as York County) and St. Peter's. Among the earliest settlers was Nicholas Gentry, who settled in New Kent in 1684. Parish registers of St. Peter's Parish show that Nicholas Gentry's daughter was baptized in the church in 1687. In 1719 the Virginia General Assembly split New Kent County, and what had been established St. Paul's Parish became Hanover County.

New Kent county's first brick courthouse was built by 1695, but it and two successors were destroyed in 1753 and 1775. Another fire in 1783 destroyed the clerk's office and jail, so few colonial era non-religious records remain. However, a manual entitled "The Office and Authority of a Justice of Peace" published in 1736 by county court justice George Webb, the son of London merchant Conrad Webb and whose son Lewis Webb would briefly represent New Kent county in the House of Burgesses and later in the House of Delegates during the American Revolutionary War. Perhaps the county's most noteworthy patriot during the conflict was James, an enslaved man who became a double agent, and whose reports to the Marquis de Lafayette helped secure victory during the Siege of Yorktown months after British troops led by Lt. Gen. Charles Cornwallis passed through the county seat (and raided local plantations) in June 1781. In addition to men who enlisted in the army, New Kent county also established an American military hospital during the conflict. As the result of arson confessed to by John Price Posey and Thomas Green, and allegedly involving "a negro boy belonging to W. Chamberlayne", many later county records were burned, making identifying relationships between family members difficult.

Two wives of US presidents - Martha Washington and Letitia Christian Tyler—were born in New Kent County. The church where George and Martha Washington are believed to have been wed, St. Peter's, still holds services today.

Confederate and Union troops fought in as well as passed through New Kent County during the Peninsula Campaign of 1862. The Battle of New Market Heights in September 1864 proved a crucial victory as Federal forces pushed toward the capitol in the Richmond-Petersburg Campaign. A later courthouse, damaged during the Civil War, was replaced in 1909.

During the state's Massive Resistance crisis in the 1960s, the United States Supreme Court decision in Green v. County School Board of New Kent County (1968) limited the use of freedom of choice plans at publicly funded  schools. where the actual operation of such plans delayed racial desegregation.

In 2006, the U.S. Census Bureau, which considers both New Kent County and Hanover County part of the Richmond metropolitan area, rated New Kent County among the top 100 fastest-growing counties in the U.S.

Geography
The northeast border of the county is defined by the meanderings of the Pamunkey River, and the southwest county border is similarly defined by the Chickahominy River. The county terrain consists of rolling hills, either wooded or devoted to agriculture, and carved by drainages. The terrain slopes to the east and south, with its highest point on the west border at 174' (53m) ASL. The county has a total area of 223 sq mi (579 km2), of which 210 sq mi (543 km2) are land and 14 square miles (36 km2) (6.23%) are covered by water.

Adjacent counties

 King William County - north
 King and Queen County - northeast
 James City County - southeast
 Charles City County -south
 Henrico County - southwest
 Hanover County - west

Protected areas
 Crawfords State Forest
 Cumberland Marsh Natural Area Preserve

Lakes

 Cooks Millpond
 Davis Pond
 Davis Pond North
 Diascund Creek Reservoir
 Goddins Pond
 Kent Lake
 Old Forge Pond
 Richardson Millpond (part)
 Taylor Pond

Demographics

2020 census

Note: the US Census treats Hispanic/Latino as an ethnic category. This table excludes Latinos from the racial categories and assigns them to a separate category. Hispanics/Latinos can be of any race.

2010 Census
As of the 2010 United States Census,  18,429 people were living in the county; 81.7% were White, 13.5% African American, 1.1% Native American, 0.9% Asian, 0.5% of some other race, and 2.3% of two or more races. About 2.1% were Hispanic or Latino (of any race). By ancestry, 15.2% were of English, 11.7% American, 10.6% German, and 9.4% Irish descent.

At the 2000 United States Census,  13,462 people, 4,925 households and 3,895 families were residing in the county. The population density was 64.1/sqmi (24.8/km2). The 5,203 housing units averaged 24.8 per sq mi (9.57/km2). The racial makeup of the county was 80.26% White, 16.20% African American, 1.29% Native American, 0.53% Asian, 0.54% from other races, and 1.17% from two or more races. About 1.31% of the population were Hispanic or Latino of any race.

Of the 4,925 households,  34.70% had children under the age of 18 living with them, 66.60% were married couples living together, 9.00% had a female householder with no husband present, and 20.90% were not families. About 16.60% of all households were made up of individuals, and 5.60% had someone living alone who was 65 years of age or older. The average household size was 2.65, and the average family size was 2.97.

The county's age distribution was 25.00% under 18, 5.90% from 18 to 24, 32.00% from 25 to 44, 27.70% from 45 to 64, and 9.40% who were 65 or older. The median age was 38 years. For every 100 females, there were 102.60 males. For every 100 females age 18 and over, there were 99.90 males.

The median income for a household was $53,595, and for a family was $60,678. Males had a median income of $40,005 versus $28,894 for females. The per capita income for the county was $22,893. About 4.90% of the population and 3.40% of families were below the poverty line.  Of the people living in poverty, 7.40% were under the age of 18 and 7.00% were 65 or older.

Notable People

 Jamion Christian, former Head Coach, Men’s Basketball, George Washington University (DC).
 Jarrell Christian, Head Coach, Maine Celtics.
 Letitia Christian Tyler  was the first wife of President John Tyler and first lady of the United States from 1841 to 1842.
 Martha Washington wife of 1st U.S. President,  George Washington and 1st First Lady of the United States of America.

Education
New Kent County has four schools within its school system. The two elementary schools are New Kent Elementary and George W. Watkins Elementary. The school system also includes New Kent Middle School and New Kent High School. All four schools are fully accredited by the Virginia Department of Education. At the high-school level, various honors and advanced-placement courses are available, along with dual enrollment through Rappahannock Community College. Gifted and enrichment programs are offered in all grades kindergarten through 12th grade.

The roughly 430 employees include 220 licensed teachers, seven guidance counselors, four media specialists, four principals, five assistant principals, and a central office staff composed of one superintendent and five directors. As of 2018, the superintendent is Brian Nichols, and the assistant superintendent is Ed Smith.

New Kent County received a new site for Rappahannock Community College in 2015, located at the renovated "historic" New Kent High School site. The site offers engineering, nursing, and basic college-level courses in New Kent.

Transportation

Highways
 Interstate 64 traverses the county, with four exits (205, 211, 214, and 220), roughly paralleling U.S. 60.
 Major state highways include State Routes 30, 33, 106, 155, 249, and 273.

Railroads
 CSX Transportation
 Norfolk Southern

No passenger rail stations are in New Kent County. The nearest Amtrak service is at stations in Williamsburg and Richmond.

Air
 New Kent Airport (W96)) - near Quinton (general aviation facility)
 Commercial passenger services and cargo services are offered at Richmond International Airport - in Henrico County, about 10 miles west of Bottoms Bridge.

Attractions

Two golf courses are available in New Kent County:
 The Golf Club at Brickshire
 The Club at Viniterra

Communities
No towns in New Kent County are incorporated. Unincorporated towns and communities include:

Census-designated place
 New Kent (county seat)

Unincorporated communities

 Baltimore Crossroads
 Barhamsville
 Bottoms Bridge
 Carps Corner
 Chickahominy Shores
 Crumps Mill
 Eltham
 Hampstead
 Lanexa
 Mountcastle
 Patriot's Landing (subdivision)
 Plum Point
 Poplar Grove
 Providence Forge
 Quinton
 Slaterville
 Talleysville
 Tunstall
 Walkers
 White House
 White Oak Landing
 Woodhaven Shores

Media

 New Kent Charles City Chronicle, online edition
 New Kent - Charles City Chronicle: Community newspaper, published weekly
 New Kent Cablevision
 Tidewater Review, online edition

Politics
New Kent County is traditionally Republican. In only one national election since 1972 has the county selected the Democratic Party candidate.

See also
 National Register of Historic Places listings in New Kent County, Virginia

References

External links
 The Official Site of New Kent County
 New Kent's Web Site
 New Kent County Public Schools ("New" website)
 New Kent County Public Schools ("Old" website)
 New Kent County, Virginia - Economic Development Authority
 New Kent Travel and Tourism

 
Virginia counties
1654 establishments in Virginia
Greater Richmond Region
Populated places established in 1654